Brandy Pyle (born September 11, 1980) is an American politician who has served in the North Dakota House of Representatives from the 22nd district since 2016.

References

1980 births
Living people
Republican Party members of the North Dakota House of Representatives
21st-century American politicians
21st-century American women politicians
Women state legislators in North Dakota